KNMO-FM is a radio station airing a country music format licensed to Nevada, Missouri, broadcasting on 97.5 MHz FM.  The station is owned by Harbit Communications, Inc.  Double K Country is also heard on sister station AM 1240 KNEM.

References

External links

Country radio stations in the United States
NMO-FM